The Kirkintilloch Herald is a weekly tabloid newspaper serving the Kirkintilloch area of East Dunbartonshire, in Scotland. It is edited and printed in Kirkintilloch, and is known locally as the Kirky Herald. It also prints a Bishopbriggs edition.

History
The newspaper was founded in 1883 in premises on the Cowgate by town businessman Donald MacLeod.
It has been published by Johnston Press since the early 1970s.

Editions
In addition to the main edition, there is one local sub-edition,  sharing the same website:

Bishopbriggs Herald

Both editions come out on Wednesdays.

Campaigns
The paper has often been at the forefront of local causes, including a long-running but ultimately unsuccessful campaign to save accident and emergency and in-patient services at Stobhill Hospital.

Editors
 Christine McPherson 1987 -2005 
 Jim Holland 2005 -

References

External links
Kirkintilloch Herald On Line Edition

Newspapers published in Scotland
Newspapers established in 1883
Kirkintilloch
1883 establishments in Scotland